The  is a bus company within the Keisei Group. It was established on 1 October 2003 to inherit all business of the Keisei Electric Railway bus department.

Local bus services

Offices
 Edogawa Office
 Kanamachi Office
 Matsudo Office
 Ichikawa Office
 Shintoshin Office
 Narashino Branch Office
 Naganuma Office
 Chiba Office

Bus routes

Others

IC Card Tokyo One-Day Pass 
This pass provides passengers unlimited use of all Keisei Bus and Keisei Town Bus buses in Tokyo, including 金61 in Saitama, as well as Arakawa City and Sumida City community buses. It is not valid for expressway and midnight bus routes.

Fare
520 yen (adults)
260 yen (child)

Subsidiaries
The following companies demerged from Keisei Electric Railway and Keisei Bus between 1990 and 2000.

Chiba Flower Bus

The  is a bus company that demerged from the Naruto Office.

Outline 
Initially named the 'Reinetsu Service', the bus company was established on 2 October 1991. It was renamed 'Chiba Flower Bus' on 2 August 1994, and started operating many bus routes which were transferred from Keisei Electric Railway on 1 May 1995. Over time, bus routes with low usage were discontinued or unified, and bus routes within Narutō were established around Narutō Station and Chiba Station by a community-based company.

Office

 Head Office, located at the Narutō Garage, a 5-minute walk from Narutō Station.

 Nakano Office

Routes
Bus route map
Community Buses
Yachimata City Community Bus
Sanmu City Community Bus
The expressway buses run via Chiba-Tōgane Road.

Chiba Rainbow Bus

The  is a bus company that demerged from the Funabashi Office (Funao Garage) and the Matsudo Office (Shiroi Garage).

Outline
This company was established on 1 June 1998. Many of its bus routes were transferred from Keisei Electric Railway.

Office
Head Office (Funao Garage)
Shiroi Office

Bus routes

Expressway buses
The company does not have any expressway bus routes.

Community buses
Shiroi City Community Bus
Kamagaya City Community Bus

Chiba City Bus

The  is a bus company that demerged from the Chiba Office (Shinjuku Garage).

Outline
This company was established in February 1999 and started to operate on 16 January 2000 with two initial bus routes: the Pride City line, and the Saiwaicho Danchi line. These have now expanded to 11 routes in Chiba, especially around Chiba Station, as well as airport bus routes.

Office
Head Office (Shinminato Garage)
It is located a 25-minute walk from Nishi-Nobuto Station and Midori-dai Station.

Routes
Local bus routes

Chiba Green Bus

The  is a bus company that demerged from the Sakura Office.

Outline
This company was established on 9 February 2000, and started operating bus routes transferred from Keisei Electric Railway on 16 July 2000. Bus routes with low earning rate were discontinued or unified, while specialized bus routes in the city of Sakura were established around Sakura Station by a community-based company.

Since 2010, Chiba Green Bus has operated the MyTown Direct bus, an expressway and midnight bus for commuters and from/to Tokyo.

Office
Sakura Office, located near Keisei Sakura Station; nearby is the Tamachi Garage (Sakura Office)

Bus routes

 Route map

Community bus route map (routes consigned from the city of Sakura)

Keisei Bus System

The  is a bus company that demerged from the Funabashi Office.

Outline
This company was established on 22 November 2005 to manage charted buses and courtesy of companies in Funabashi, and started operating many bus routes transferred from Keisei Bus on 1 December 2007. In 2012, the Kashiwai Line, Shinai Line, and Higashi–Funabashi Line were transferred to this company when the Keisei Bus Hanawa Garage closed.

Office
Head Office

Routes

Airport Bus TYO-NRT seat reservations

Seat reservations are not enabled on TYO-NRT services (excluding some services departing from Kajibashi Parking). When departing from Kajibashi Parking, board the buses 20 minutes prior to departure. Some services departing from Ginza Station do not stop at Tokyo Station.

Seat reservations are required on buses departing from Narita Airport. Reservations can be made at the tickets counter of Narita Airport. However, for early morning and the late evening buses, fares are paid with cash or IC Card when boarding the bus.

Keisei Town Bus

The  is a bus company that demerged from the Funabashi Office.

Outline
This company was established on 12 May 2000 by splitting from Keisei Electric Railway, and started operating bus routes transferred from Keisei Bus on 16 February 2001.

Office
Head Office

Routes
All bus routes are operated around Katsushika-ku, Tokyo; Edogawa-ku, Tokyo; and Taito-ku, Tokyo.
Asakusa Kotobukicho・Horikiri Shobuen Station・Kameari Station
Kameari Station・Kanamachi Station
Kanamachi Station・Misato-chuo Station
Kameari Station・Ayase Station
Asakusa Kotobukicho・Shin-Koiwa Station
Yotsugi Station・Shin-Koiwa Station
Komatsugawa Police Office・Ichinoe Station
Keisei Koiwa Station・Koiwa Station・Ichinoe Station
Koiwa Station・Keisei Koiwa Station・Shiabamata Taishakuten・Kanamachi Station
Koiwa Station・Ichikawa Station

Keisei Group Bus

Chiba Kotsu

The  is a bus company established on 16 November 1906 as a bus department of the former Seiso Electric Railway. The tram lines of Seiso Electric Railway were an affiliated company of Keisei Electric Railway (Keisei Group).

Chiba Kotsu was the parent company of Choshi Electric Railway from 1960 until 1990.

Bus routes
Choshi Station・Asahi Station (Chiba)
Keisei Narita Station・Narita Yukawa Station
Keisei Narita Station・Sawara Station
Keisei Narita Station・Sogo Reido
Keisei Narita Station・Yachimata Station
Keisei Narita Station・Yokaichiba Station

Expressway bus 
Tokyo Station・Sawara Station・Choshi Station
Namba Station・Choshi Station

Notes

See also
 Keisei Electric Railway
 Keisei Transit Bus
 Tokyo Bay City Bus
 Tokyo BRT

References

External links 

 

Keisei Electric Railway
Bus transport in Tokyo
Transport in Chiba Prefecture
Bus companies of Japan